Ramaria gelatinosa, commonly known as the gelatinous coral, is a coral mushroom in the family Gomphaceae. It is found in Europe and North America. The species was first described by Theodor Holmskjold in 1790.

The oregonensis variety, only reported from the Pacific Northwest, is reportedly inedible, as are most gelatinous species of the genus for most people. Its flesh is translucent and gelatinous, and it has a yellow band on the top part of the stem. It can be found growing around fallen wood. It differs microscopically from var. gelatinosa.

Similar species including R. flavigelatinosa, R. gelatiniaurantia, and R. sandaricina are only mildly gelatinous.

References

Gomphaceae
Fungi described in 1790
Fungi of Europe
Fungi of North America